Jean Miles Westwood (November 22, 1923 – August 18, 1997) was a political figure born in Price, Utah. Democratic presidential candidate George McGovern appointed Westwood as the first female chair of the Democratic National Committee on July 14, 1972. Between 1976 and 1988, Westwood worked for the presidential campaigns of Terry Sanford, Edward Kennedy, Gary Hart, and Bruce Babbitt.

Born Jean Miles, she married Richard E. Westwood in 1941. They started a mink farm together in 1951.

Westwood was one of McGovern's advisors who recommended dropping Thomas F. Eagleton from the ticket.

Sources
Utah history encyclopedia article on Westwood

1923 births
1997 deaths
20th-century American women politicians
20th-century American politicians
Democratic National Committee chairs
People from Price, Utah
San Diego State University alumni
University of Colorado alumni
University of Utah alumni
Utah Democrats
Utah State University alumni
Women in Utah politics